Wabtec Corporation (derived from Westinghouse Air Brake Technologies Corporation) is an American company formed by the merger of the Westinghouse Air Brake Company (WABCO) and MotivePower Industries Corporation in 1999.  It is headquartered in Pittsburgh, Pennsylvania.

The company purchased GE Transportation on February 25, 2019.

History
The company's origins go back to 1869 with the foundation of the Westinghouse Air Brake Company. That company (also known as WA&B later as WABCO) became independent in 1990 via a management buy-out, and went public in 1995. Another company, WABCO Vehicle Control Systems, also created from the Westinghouse Brake Company, is independent of Wabtec and was spun off by American Standard Companies in 2007, and is today part of German automotive components firm ZF Friedrichshafen.

The other company forming Wabtec, MotivePower Industries, can be traced back to 1972, with the formation of the MK Rail division by the Morrison Knudsen group and the purchase of a manufacturing facility in Boise. In 1994 Morrison Knudsen created a subsidiary MK Rail Corporation; during the first half of the same decade the MK Rail group expanded with the acquisition of various other locomotive component companies. In 1996, MK Rail group separated from the parent Morrison Knudsen and adopted the name MotivePower Industries Corporation. In the later half of the 1990s further companies were acquired – again all in the locomotive components business. MotivePower, a wholly owned subsidiary of Wabtec, continues to manufacture locomotives.

The corporate logo is supposed to represent an axial view of a mechanical brake valve, where different air ports line up between the 'stator' and 'rotor' depending upon the handle position.

Mergers and acquisitions
In March 2010, Wabtec announced that it had purchased Xorail, a railway signaling design and construction company for $40 million.

In July 2010, Wabtec announced the plan to purchase two manufacturers of rail equipment, Bach-Simpson Corp. and G&B Specialties. The companies produce locomotive components and track products respectively. The acquisition of G&B Specialties was completed on July 28, 2010, for approximately $31.8 million. The acquisition of Bach-Simpson Corporation was completed on August 20, 2010 for approximately $12.0 million.

In November 2010, Wabtec acquired all of the assets of Cleveland, Ohio based manufacturer of traction motors and electric coils for rail and power generation markets Swiger Coil Systems for approximately $43.0 million.

On June 14, 2012, Wabtec acquired Mors Smitt Holding for a purchase price of $88.4 million.

On June 6, 2014, Wabtec  acquired Fandstan Electric Group, a rail and industrial equipment manufacturer, for a purchase price of $199.4 million. On August 21, 2014, Wabtec acquired Dia-Frag, a manufacturer of friction products including motorcycle braking, for a purchase price of $70.6 million.

On June 17, 2015, Wabtec acquired all three units of  Metalocaucho (MTC, in Spain, China and India) who are leaders in the field of suspension and anti-vibration systems, for a purchase price of $23.4 million. On July 27, 2015, Wabtec announced that it plans to purchase 51% of Faiveley Transport's shares in a cash-and-stock deal valued at $1.8 billion, including debt. The deal closed on December 1, 2016, for a total of $1.7 billion.

On October 12, 2015, Wabtec announced its acquisition of lineside sensor manufacturer Track IQ. 

On April 20, 2018, it was reported that General Electric (GE), undergoing a strategic review, was in talks to sell its century-old locomotive business, GE Transportation, to Wabtec, according to people familiar with the matter.

On May 21, 2018, GE and Wabtec confirmed the merger of GE Transportation with Wabtec in an $11 billion deal, completed on February 25, 2019, that saw Wabtec shareholders take a 50.8% shareholding in the merged company, with GE shareholders owning 24.3% and GE itself 24.9%.

On 4 January 2022, it was announced that Wabtec had acquired the New Delhi-based railway friction business, Masu, for 34 million USD.

On 16 June 2022, it was announced that Wabtec acquired Collins Aerospace ARINC rail solutions.

United Kingdom

Brush Traction
Wabtec bought Brush Traction of Loughborough, an English locomotive builder and maintainer, for US$31 million on 25 February 2011.

Bearward Engineering
In November 2011, Wabtec acquired Bearward Engineering, an industrial radiator manufacturer employing some 300 people based in Northampton, England. Bearward Engineering mainly makes cooling systems for power generators. At the time of purchase Bearward had an annual sales of US$70 million.

Wabtec Rail UK
Wabtec Rail Limited is a railway engineering company based in at the Doncaster Works in Doncaster, England. Services include the overhaul and repair of railway rolling stock and components. Wabtec Rail occupies part of the former British Rail Engineering Limited site known locally as the Plant Works. The two main unions on site (Unite and RMT) gave notice on November 3, 2014, of their intention to ballot their members for industrial action over a pay dispute, for the first time in Wabtec Rail Limited's history.

Wabtec Rail Scotland
Wabtec Rail Scotland occupies the Kilmarnock works of the former locomotive builder Andrew Barclay Sons & Co.

LH Group Services
Wabtec announced the $48 million acquisition of diesel engine, transmission and bogie overhaul and industrial locomotive supplier LH Group on October 1, 2012. Based at Barton-under-Needwood in Staffordshire, LH has around 400 employees and annual sales of US$65m, about 10% of which are in non-rail markets.

Battery electric locomotive
In September 2021, at an event in Pittsburgh, Wabtec unveiled the world’s first battery-electric freight locomotive. It was the result of a joint venture with Carnegie Mellon University, and is part of an initiative by the two organizations to develop zero-emissions technology. Using a traditional locomotive body, the usual diesel engine has been replaced by a large bank of batteries, which drive the traction motors of the locomotive. Regenerative braking is used to help recharge the batteries.

Wabtec claimed that the next version of the locomotive, to be developed within two years, would reduce the consumption of diesel fuel by nearly a third, and that emissions could entirely eliminated through the development of accompanying hydrogen fuel cells.

References

External links

 
American brands
Rolling stock manufacturers of the United States
American companies established in 1999
Vehicle manufacturing companies established in 1999
1999 establishments in Pennsylvania
Companies listed on the New York Stock Exchange
Westinghouse Electric Company